Halls Creek is a town situated in the east Kimberley region of Western Australia. It is located between the towns of Fitzroy Crossing and Turkey Creek (Warmun) on the Great Northern Highway.  It is the only sizeable town for 600 km on the Highway.

Halls Creek is also the northern end of the Canning Stock Route, which runs 1,850 km through the Great Sandy Desert until the southern end of the route at Wiluna.

The town functions as a major hub for the local Indigenous population and as a support centre for cattle stations in the area.

Halls Creek is the administration centre for Halls Creek Shire Council.

History
The land now known as Halls Creek has been occupied for thousands of years by Aboriginal peoples. The land is crossed by songlines and trading paths stretching from the coasts to the deserts, some passing near the modern town. The story of that long occupation remains alive today and it is revealed in the culture of the Jaru, Kija, Kukatja, Walmajarri, Gooniyandi and other Indigenous people who live in Halls Creek Shire.

Late in the 19th century, Europeans arrived, searching for land for cattle and sheep, as well as minerals. On Christmas Day 1885 prospector Charlie Hall found a  gold nugget at a site that would eventually be named after him. News of the discovery drew more than 15,000 people to what is now Old Halls Creek to try their luck. It proved an inhospitable land for these people and the graves of some can be found in Old Town's small cemetery.

The gold rush lasted less than three months and Halls Creek became a trading centre for cattle stations, Aboriginal communities and miners who stayed in the area. The post office with its telegraph line that terminated here, the police station, government office, racecourse and stores gave the town a purpose. In 1918 the Australian Inland Mission built a hospital and the old town continued, with few inhabitants and little water.

In 1948 an airfield was built near the site of the present town and over the next decade the old town moved nearer to this new site. Except for the police station, which finally relocated in 1961, the old town was abandoned by 1954.

The nearby settlements known as Chinaman's Garden (Yarrunga) and Wangu Outstation (Flora Valley Station) were funded by the federal government as outstations during the 1980s.

Tourism

For tourists, there are several nearby attractions such as:
 China Wall
 Old Halls Creek
 Palm Springs
 Saw Pit Gorge
 Duncan Road
 Wolfe Creek Crater, 200 km to the south on the Tanami Road
 Purnululu National Park (the Bungle Bungles), 120 km to the north.
 Canning Stock Route 
Tourism information is available.

Indigenous Australian art 
Many talented artists producing Indigenous Australian art live in Halls Creek and the surrounding communities. Some artists sell directly, and there are also multiple art centres within the Shire of Halls Creek, where buyers can meet the artists and purchase works.
 Yarliyil Art Centre,  Halls Creek
 Warlayirti Artists Aboriginal Corporation], Wirrimanu (Balgo) Community
 Warmun Art Centre], Turkey Creek (Warmun) Community
 Laarri Gallery, Yiyili Community

Travel tips 
There are alcohol restrictions within Halls Creek. In May 2009 the state Director of Liquor Licensing imposed a "prohibition on the sale of packaged liquor with an alcohol content greater than 2.7 per cent from licensed premises" in the town.  In September 2009 it was reported that assaults and drink driving arrests had decreased dramatically as a result of the bans. Full strength alcohol can be purchased with a meal at the local motel or hotel, however take-away sales of alcohol above 2.7% are prohibited.

Halls Creek has two distinct seasons, the wet season (November - March) and the dry season (April - October). Permanent surface water sources are scarce during the dry season. During the wet season, Halls Creek is often cut off due to flooding; water levels can rise and fall very rapidly.

Permits are required in some areas.

Impact craters
Aside from the well known and well preserved Wolfe Creek Crater, averaging about 875 metres in diameter, nearby there is also Goat Paddock crater, 7 km in diameter and 106 km west-southwest of Halls Creek, and Piccaninny crater, 7 km in diameter, within the Purnululu (Bungle Bungle) National Park. Near the other end of the Tanami Road in the Northern Territory, over 1000 km away from Halls Creek, is Gosses Bluff crater, with the 5 km diameter, 180 m high crater-like feature, now exposed, being interpreted as the eroded relic of the crater's central uplift.

Indigenous population
In the 2016 Census, there were 1,546 people in Halls Creek. Aboriginal and Torres Strait Islander people made up 66.9% of the population.

It is home to the Indigenous Djaru and Gija peoples as well as some Tjurabalan peoples from the desert to the south of the town. Indigenous people have lived in the region for at least 30,000 years. "Aboriginal people in Halls Creek are predominantly Jaru and Kija peoples. Many residents celebrate both Jaru and Kija heritage. there are also significant numbers of Gooniyandi people from further east, Walmajarri from the south-east and Kukatja people originally from the desert country to the south. Over the years other Aboriginal people from nearby groups have moved to Halls Creek. These include the Gurindji and the Walpiri from the east, the Ngardi from the south-east and Malngin from the north-east."

Climate
Halls Creek has a warm semi-arid climate (BSh according to the Köppen climate classification) with a dry season and a wet season. Halls Creek has never recorded a temperature below freezing point.

Halls Creek receives  of precipitation annually. There is a wet season from December to March and a dry season for the rest of the year. The hottest time of year is just before the wet season and at the start of it, from October to January. The dry season is cooler and has a higher diurnal temperature variation. January is the wettest month, receiving  of rain on average. August is the driest month, receiving only  of rainfall. August has the least precipitation days with 0.5 and January has the most with 13.5 days. Humidity is low year-round, but it is higher during the wet season. Halls Creek receives 3439 hours of sunshine annually, with July having the most sunshine and February having the least.

Heavy rare earth mine

See also
 Halls Creek Airport
 Carnegie expedition of 1896

References

External links
 Shire of Halls Creek
 Halls Creek tourism

Towns in Western Australia
Kimberley (Western Australia)
Canning Stock Route